Litocala is a monotypic moth genus in the family Erebidae. Its only species, Litocala sexsignata, the litocala moth, is found in the United States in Washington, Montana, Utah and Colorado south to southern California and northern Baja California in Mexico. Both the genus and species were first described by Leon F. Harvey, the genus in 1878 and the species three years earlier. The habitat consists of oak woodlands and forests.

The length of the forewings is 13–15 mm. The forewings are dark gray with an oblique whitish or silvery antemedian band and reniform spot. The hindwings are black with three large white spots, forming a triangle in the median area. Adults are on wing from March to June. They have been recorded sipping moisture at puddles and has also been found nectaring at willow catkins.

Subspecies
Litocala sexsignata sexsignata
Litocala sexsignata deserta Edwards, 1881

References

External links

Melipotini
Moths described in 1875
Moths of North America
Monotypic moth genera

Taxa named by Leon F. Harvey